The Sunda coucal (Centropus nigrorufus) is a cuckoo species in the family Cuculidae that is endemic to Java, Indonesia. It inhabits mangroves, freshwater swamp forests and grasslands near brackish water. It has been listed as Vulnerable on the IUCN Red List since 1994, as the small population is threatened by habitat destruction and trapping.
It feeds on grasshoppers, ground beetles, moths, geckos, snakes and frogs; it was also observed while picking rice seeds in a paddy field.

References

External links

Sunda coucal
Birds of Java
Sunda coucal
Sunda coucal
Taxonomy articles created by Polbot